Adli or Adly may refer to:
 Adly, a Taiwanese scooter manufacturer
Adli (name)